The West Virginia State Highway System is an integrated system of numbered roads in the U.S. state of West Virginia. These highways were coordinated by the West Virginia Department of Transportation, Division of Highways.

Types 

West Virginia state highways have a square-shaped highway shield.

West Virginia has a system of secondary state highways that are functionally similar to county roads in most other states.  Secondary road designations are only unique within each county.  There are two types of secondary roads:

 Trunk secondary roads have a single number in a circular highway shield.
 Spur secondary roads are given "fractional" designations with two numbers displayed vertically: the top number specifies the trunk road or highway they diverge from, and the bottom is a serial number reflecting the order in which the number was assigned.  In many cases, if the trunk road is rerouted or renumbered, the spur roads are not renumbered to reflect the change.

In addition, Home Access Road Program roads have a house-shaped pentagonal shield.  They are assigned to dead-end shared driveways.  The program began in 1998.

Delta roads had a triangular highway shield.  They were assigned to private roads maintained by the state.  The system came about in the 1960s, and was phased out in the 1990s, and very few delta markers remain.

Historical timeline

1910s
 1913 West Virginia Legislature creates State Road Bureau
 1917 West Virginia Legislature creates State Road Commission

1920s
 1920 Good Roads Amendment passed
 1921 Congress directs each state to recommend roads for Federal Aid
 1922 State Road designations completed
 1925 US Numbered Highway System created

1930s
 1933 All public roads outside of municipalities brought under state control

See also
List of state routes in West Virginia

References

External links
WVDOT Traffic Engineering Directives
West Virginia Highways at AARoads
West Virginia Department of Transportation